Ophiodermella ogurana is a species of sea snail, a marine gastropod mollusk in the family Borsoniidae.

Description

Distribution
This rare marine species occurs off Japan in sand and muddy sand. It was originally found as a fossil from the upper Musashino of Kazusa and Shimosa, Japan.

References

 Yokoyama, Matajiro. "Fossils from the upper Musashino of Kazusa and Shimosa." (1922).
 Gul'bin, V. V. "Fauna of prosobranch gastropods of Peter the Great Bay, Sea of Japan, and the biogeographical composition." Russian Journal of Marine Biology 30.1 (2004): 1–10.
 Kantor Yu.I. & Sysoev A.V. (2006) Marine and brackish water Gastropoda of Russia and adjacent countries: an illustrated catalogue. Moscow: KMK Scientific Press. 372 pp. + 140 pls.

External links
  Gulbin, Vladimir V. "Review of the Shell-bearing Gastropods in the Russian Waters of the East Sea (Sea of Japan). III. Caenogastropoda: Neogastropoda." The Korean Journal of Malacology 25.1 (2009): 51–70

ogurana
Gastropods described in 1922